Pimprana is a monotypic moth genus of the family Noctuidae. Its only species, Pimprana atkinsoni, is found in Darjeeling, India. Both the genus and species were first described by Frederic Moore in 1879.

References

Moths described in 1879
Agaristinae
Moths of Asia
Monotypic moth genera